Nahshon (lit. Pioneer) is a kibbutz in central Israel. Located in the Ayalon Valley to the south-west of Modi'in, it falls under the jurisdiction of Mateh Yehuda Regional Council.

History
The village was established in 1950 by immigrant members of Hashomer Hatzair. It was named after Operation Nachshon, which opened up the Jerusalem road during the 1948 Arab–Israeli War.

After the Six-Day War in 1967, some 80 Egyptian soldiers were buried in a mass-grave in fields tended by kibbutz Nahshon. The field was later turned into a tourist attraction, called "Mini Israel".

References

External links
Kibbutz website 

Kibbutzim
Kibbutz Movement
Populated places established in 1950
Populated places in Jerusalem District
1950 establishments in Israel